Dean Justin Canto (born 24 September 1980) is a multiple-championship winning Australian motor racing driver. Best noted as a Supercars driver, Canto was the inaugural winner of the second-tier V8 Supercar development series in 2000, and the first to become a multiple-champion five years later. Canto has been a regular in the main Supercars Championship for a variety of teams racing both full-time and as a part-time endurance race co-driver.

Racing career
After winning a national and two state titles in kart racing, Canto graduated to the Australian GT Production Car Championship and finished the Championship in 11th overall, and second within Class B in which his Subaru Impreza WRX raced. He then backed up this performance with a victory in the 1998 Sandown 1 Hour driving a Maserati Ghibli co-driving with Alfredo Costanzo. Another second in class placing followed in 1999 driving a Ford Mondeo in the Independents class of the Australian Super Touring Championship.

Later that year, Canto made his V8 Supercar début in the Shell Championship Series at Oran Park Raceway then went on to drive in the Queensland 500 and Bathurst Classic as well as racing his Mondeo at the Bathurst 1000.

In 2000, Canto won the inaugural Konica V8 Lites Series driving a Ford EL Falcon under the banner of Dean Canto Racing. In 2001, Canto drove with Ford Tickford Racing at the Queensland 500 and Bathurst 1000. He achieved a ninth placing in the Queensland 500 and fifth with teammate Jim Richards in the Bathurst 1000. Canto added another title with his victory in the Young Guns races at the Honda IndyCar Carnival, a one-make event for emerging young drivers in road specification Honda Integras.

In 2002, Canto became co-driver to Max Wilson at Briggs Motor Sport and in 2003, achieved a full-time drive with the same team. Canto was diagnosed with Alopecia Universalis, a very rare medical condition that causes rapid hair loss to the body. Medical advice reassured Canto that the condition would, in no way, affect his overall health. With concerns allayed, Canto then took the time to adjust to the condition, renew his confidence and focus, stronger than ever, on more driving success.

In the later half of the 2003 season, Canto pulled off a number of strong performances and top 10 finishes and was awarded the VIP Top Dog award, however it was not enough for Canto to keep his full-time drive. Canto was retained as the endurance race co-driver with team under its new ownership identity of Triple Eight Race Engineering for the 2004 season.

The following year Dick Johnson Racing appointed Canto to drive the Gatorz Racing Development Series Ford Falcon. The season proved a success. Canto won five of the seven rounds, qualified on pole position on six of seven occasions, won nine of the ten races where he started on the front row of the grid and won ten races in total. Canto's times were so fast that he could qualify in the Supercars Top 20 (even though the Development cars had a 100 kg lead weight disadvantage). He set new Development Series lap records at Adelaide and Wakefield Park and new qualifying lap records at the Clipsal 500 and Queensland rounds. At the season's conclusion he became the first driver ever to win two Development Series Championships.

Canto proved once again his worth as an endurance driver teaming up with Glenn Seton at the endurance rounds in a DJR Falcon. The pair finished ninth at Bathurst even with an engine misfire.

Canto's performance in 2005 caught the attention of Garry Rogers Motorsport team Principal Garry Rogers. He asked Canto to fill the vacant seat of the #34 Valvoline Repco Cummins VZ Commodore for the Indy 300 and Tasmanian rounds of the V8 Supercar Championship Series. The car finished well and both team and driver realised that a longer-term relationship would be beneficial for team and driver. Canto signed a multi year deal with GRM as the team's lead driver for their assault on the 2006 V8 Supercar Championship Series.

The 2006 series saw Canto achieve his first win in the main category, the reverse grid race at Barbagallo Raceway. After a difficult 2007 season, Canto's GRM contract was cut leaving Canto without a full-time drive in 2008. Canto returned to the Development series with Howard Racing but just missed out on his third title, finishing second to Steve Owen.

Since then Canto has competed as an endurance co-driver with Ford Performance Racing under its numerous banners from 2008 to 2018. His time there included a 2nd place at the Bathurst 1000 in 2012, and a win at the Gold Coast 600 in 2014, both alongside long time teammate, David Reynolds.

In 2019, Canto competed in his 21st Bathurst 1000 alongside Macauley Jones at Brad Jones Racing.

Career results

Supercars Championship results
(key) (Races in bold indicate pole position) (Races in italics indicate fastest lap)

Complete Bathurst 1000 results

References

External links
 Dean Canto at the V8 Supercars official website
 Dean Canto at Driver Database
 Dean Canto at Speedsport Magazine
 Profile at Racing Reference

1980 births
Sportsmen from New South Wales
Living people
Racing drivers from Sydney
Supercars Championship drivers
V8SuperTourer drivers
Stock Car Brasil drivers
Australian Endurance Championship drivers
Garry Rogers Motorsport drivers
Dick Johnson Racing drivers